Alexis Restaurant (sometimes Alexis Greek Restaurant) was a Greek restaurant in Portland, Oregon's Old Town Chinatown neighborhood, in the United States. It closed on November 7, 2016, after operating for 36 years.

Description 
The Greek restaurant operated on West Burnside Street in Portland's Old Town Chinatown neighborhood. The menu included braised lamb shanks, fried calamari, and saganaki.

History
In 1981, a few years after immigrating from Greece, Gary Tsirimiagos opened Alexis Restaurant. The restaurant was the city's first to serve fried calamari.

In 2015, Tsirimiagos bought out co-owner Alexis Bakouros, who continued ownership of Alexis, Inc., a grocery store and catering business that had been affiliated with the restaurant.

On November 7, 2016, after operating for 36 years, Alexis Restaurant closed. Owner Tsirimiagos stated that he was closing the restaurant to focus on his family and traveling. The restaurant was replaced with, Nyx, a two-story nightclub that planned to include elements of Greek mythology in its décor as a tribute to Alexis Restaurant. Alexis, Inc. remains open for importing and distributing foods as well as catering.

See also
 List of defunct restaurants of the United States
 List of Greek restaurants

References

External links
  (archived version)
 Alexis at Zomato

1981 establishments in Oregon
2016 disestablishments in Oregon
Defunct European restaurants in Portland, Oregon
Defunct Greek restaurants
Greek restaurants in Oregon
Greek-American culture in Portland, Oregon
Old Town Chinatown
Restaurants disestablished in 2016
Restaurants established in 1981